Lux Cozi is an Indian brand of men's underwear, part of the Lux Industries Ltd (LIL) group based in Kolkata, West Bengal, India.  The brand turnover is about ₹200 crores, mostly from rural India. The Lux Innerwear brand was launched by LIL in 1963. Today, it is sold in 5 lakh retail outlets across India.

Bollywood associations

The Lux brand has been endorsed by the Bollywood actors Shahrukh Khan, Sunny Deol and Suniel Shetty. Indian television personalities Aman Verma and Shekhar Suman & Ali Asgar as well as actor-director Satish Kaushik have also endorsed Lux Cozi products. Sunny Deol and Sushant Singh Rajput have also endorse this brand.

Varun Dhawan has been recently chosen to be the brand ambassador of Lux Cozi in 2017. In September 2022, Lux Cozi signed Saurav Ganguly as new brand ambassador.

IPL associations

Lux Cozi sponsors the Indian Premier League of cricket. In the IPL season 5, Lux Cozi was an official sponsor of the Kings XI Punjab team. It also had its branding on the helmets of the erstwhile Deccan Chargers. For the 2013 Indian Premier League, Lux Cozi was an official partner of Kings XI Punjab and erstwhile Pune Warriors India, Lux Cozi is also one of the official sponsors of the Kolkata Knight Riders in Dream 11 IPL 2020.

Lux Cozi Times of India Film Awards - 2013

Lux Cozi was the title sponsor of the Times of India Film Awards 2013(TOIFA) that were held in Vancouver, British Columbia, Canada. Bollywood fans vote on the nomination categories to determine the winners of the choice categories. Technical awards are also awarded.

References

Clothing brands of India
Underwear brands
Clothing companies of India
Companies based in Kolkata
1963 establishments in West Bengal
Clothing companies established in 1963